The 2013 British Columbia Scotties Tournament of Hearts, the women's provincial curling championship for British Columbia, was held from January 14 to 20 at the Cloverdale Curling Club in Cloverdale, British Columbia. The winning team represented British Columbia at the 2013 Scotties Tournament of Hearts in Kingston, Ontario.

Qualification Process
Ten teams qualified for the provincial tournament through several methods. The qualification process is as follows:

Teams
The teams are listed as follows:

Round-robin standings
Final round-robin standings

Round-robin results
All draw times are listed in Pacific Standard Time (UTC-8).

Draw 1
Monday, January 14, 11:00 am

Draw 2
Monday, January 14, 6:30 pm

Draw 3
Tuesday, January 15, 11:00 am

Draw 4
Tuesday, January 15, 6:30 pm

Draw 5
Wednesday, January 16, 11:00 am

Draw 6
Wednesday, January 16, 6:30 pm

Draw 7
Thursday, January 17, 11:00 am

Draw 8
Thursday, January 17, 6:30 pm

Draw 9
Friday, January 18, 9:30 am

Tiebreaker
Friday, January 18

Playoffs

1 vs. 2
Friday, January 18, 7:00 pm

3 vs. 4
Saturday, January 19, 10:00 am

Semifinal
Saturday, January 19, 5:30 pm

Final
Sunday, January 20, 2:00 pm

Qualification rounds

Round 1
The first qualification round for the 2013 British Columbia Scotties took place from November 16 to 18, 2012 at the Vernon Curling Club in Vernon. The qualifier was held in a double knockout format, and qualified three teams for the provincial playdowns.

Teams

Results

Round 2
The second qualification round for the 2013 British Columbia Scotties took place from November 30 to December 2, 2012 at the North Shore Curling Club in North Vancouver, British Columbia. The qualifier was held in a double knockout format, and qualified three teams for the provincial playdowns.

Teams

Results

Round 3
The third qualification round for the 2013 British Columbia Scotties took place from December 14 to 16, 2012 at the Prince George Curling Club in Prince George, British Columbia. The qualifier was held in a double knockout format, and qualified two teams for the provincial playdowns.

Teams

Results
Round Robin

Playoffs
Fox played Hicks for the first spot in the provincials. Hicks played Olsen for the second spot after losing to Fox.

References

External links

Results at playdowns.com

British Columbia
Sport in Surrey, British Columbia
British Columbia Scotties Tournament of Hearts
Scotties Tournament of Hearts